Olidous Operettas is the second full-length album from The County Medical Examiners, as well as their first on Relapse Records. This is also the first album in the history of Relapse Records to feature a "scratch-n-sniff" CD face. According to the liner notes the odor of "corpse reek" on the CD face was donated by John Doe #4502.

Track listing

Personnel
 Dr. Morton Fairbanks - guitars, vocals
 Dr. Guy Radcliffe - bass, vocals
 Dr. Jack Putnam - drums, vocals

Production
Arranged & Produced By The County Medical Examiners
Recorded, Engineered & Mixed By Matthew Widener

References

External links
"Olidous Operettas" at discogs

The County Medical Examiners albums
2007 albums
Relapse Records albums